Amblin Television is the television production division of Amblin Partners. It was established in 1984 by Amblin Entertainment as a small-screen production arm for Steven Spielberg's Amazing Stories anthology series for NBC. The company has produced television series including Tiny Toon Adventures, Animaniacs, SeaQuest DSV, ER, Falling Skies, and The Americans.

In 2013, DreamWorks Television, producer of such series as Spin City, Taken, Band of Brothers, The Pacific, United States of Tara, Smash, and the HBO film All the Way, was merged into Amblin Television. Since then, the combined company has produced television shows including The Borgias, Under the Dome, The Haunting and Roswell, New Mexico.

History 
In the 1980s and 1990s, Amblin Television produced television series, specials, made-for-TV and cable films, and animated children's programming such as Tiny Toon Adventures and Animaniacs, along with television series adaptations based around Amblin's popular feature films such as Back to the Future, An American Tail, Casper, and Men in Black. In the 1990s, they also ventured into live-action series production with Harry and the Hendersons, seaQuest DSV and Earth 2. Its longest running television series is ER, which aired from 1994 until 2009 for 15 seasons. The company also entered the streaming television market with specials and series including the documentary Five Came Back and The Haunting, both for Netflix.

In 2013, DreamWorks Television was merged into Amblin Television, the former having been founded by Steven Spielberg and DreamWorks SKG partners Jeffrey Katzenberg and David Geffen in 1996. Soon after the DreamWorks merger, Darryl Frank and Justin Falvey were named co-presidents of Amblin Television. Under their leadership, the company would develop and produce several series including The Americans, The Haunting, and Roswell, New Mexico.

Current television series

Future television series

Former television series

Television specials

Television films

Future television films

References 

Amblin Partners
Amblin Entertainment
American companies established in 1984
Companies based in Los Angeles
1984 establishments in California
Mass media companies established in 1984
Steven Spielberg
Television production companies of the United States